William Savile may refer to:

Sir William Savile, 3rd Baronet (1612–1644), MP for Yorkshire and Old Sarum
William Savile, 2nd Marquess of Halifax (1665–1700), MP for Newark-on-Trent
William Savile (MP for Lincolnshire), see Lincolnshire (UK Parliament constituency)

See also
William Saville (disambiguation)